The Hipposideridae are a family of bats commonly known as the Old World leaf-nosed bats. While it has often been seen as a subfamily, Hipposiderinae, of the family Rhinolophidae, it is now more generally classified as its own family. Nevertheless, it is most closely related to Rhinolophidae within the suborder Yinpterochiroptera.

Taxonomy 
The Hipposideridae contain 10 living genera and more than 70 species, mostly in the widespread genus Hipposideros. In addition, several fossil genera are known; the oldest fossils attributed to the family are from the middle Eocene of Europe. In their 1997 Classification of Mammals, Malcolm C. McKenna and Susan K. Bell proposed a division of Hipposideridae (called Rhinonycterinae in their work) into three tribes, one with two subtribes, but these tribes turned out to be non-monophyletic and have been abandoned. A different classification was proposed by Hand and Kirsch in 2003. In 2009, Petr Benda and Peter Vallo proposed a separate tribe, Triaenopini, for the genera Triaenops, Paratriaenops, and possibly Cloeotis, synonymised in a 2014 revision (Foley, et al.) that elevated the family Rhinonycteridae. The Hipposideridae have many different families, previously confused to be the same for their similar appearance. The Hipposideridae fulvus is very similar to the Hipposideridae Pomona, which were a part of the same family in the past. The macrobullatus, considered to be a subspecies of the Hipposideridae are also part of a different family. Among the Hipposideridae species, there is an increased amount of mitochondrial differentation, possibly leading to these subspecies being intermixed and confused as one.

Genera
The genera included in Hipposideridae are:

Living
Anthops (one species; Solomon Islands and Bougainville Island)
Asellia (four species; Africa and southwestern Asia; Miocene fossils from Europe)
Aselliscus (three species; southeastern Asia and Melanesia)
Coelops (at least two species; southeastern Asia; Miocene fossils from Africa)
Doryrhina (two species, Africa)
Hipposideros (more than sixty species; Africa, southern Eurasia, and Australasia; oldest fossils from the Eocene of Europe; includes Pseudorhinolophus, sometimes considered a separate genus)
Macronycteris (five species, Africa and Madagascar)
(Note that genus Paracoelops was previously listed for Vietnam is now a synonym of Hipposideros pomona)

Extinct
Archerops (Miocene of Australia)
Miophyllorhina (Miocene of Australia)
Palaeophyllophora (Eocene to Miocene of Europe)
Paraphyllophora (Eocene or Oligocene to Miocene of Europe)
Riversleigha (Miocene of Australia)
Vaylatsia (Oligocene of Europe)
Xenorhinos (Miocene of Australia)

List of species

 
 
 Family Hipposideridae — Old World leaf-nosed bats
 Genus Anthops
Flower-faced bat, Anthops ornatus
 Genus Asellia — trident leaf-nosed bats
Arabian trident bat, Asellia arabica
Somalian trident bat, Asellia italosomalica
Patrizi's trident leaf-nosed bat, Asellia patrizii
Trident bat, Asellia tridens
 Genus Aselliscus — Tate's trident-nosed bats
Stoliczka's trident bat, Aselliscus stoliczkanus
Temminck's trident bat, Aselliscus tricuspidatus
Dong Bac's trident bat, Aselliscus dongbacana
 Genus Coelops — tailless leaf-nosed bats
East Asian tailless leaf-nosed bat, Coelops frithii
Philippine tailless leaf-nosed bat, Coelops hirsutus
Malayan tailless leaf-nosed bat, Coelops robinsoni
 Genus Doryrhina — roundleaf bats
Greater roundleaf bat, Doryrhina camerunensis
Cyclops roundleaf bat, Doryrhina cyclops
 Genus Hipposideros — roundleaf bats
Aba roundleaf bat, Hipposideros abae
Ha Long leaf-nosed bat, Hipposideros alongensis
Great roundleaf bat, Hipposideros armiger
Dusky roundleaf bat, Hipposideros ater
Benito roundleaf bat, Hipposideros beatus
Bicolored roundleaf bat, Hipposideros bicolor
Boeadi’s roundleaf bat, Hipposideros boeadii
Short-headed roundleaf bat, Hipposideros breviceps
Sundevall's roundleaf bat, Hipposideros caffer
Spurred roundleaf bat, Hipposideros calcaratus
Fawn leaf-nosed bat or fawn roundleaf bat, Hipposideros cervinus
Ashy roundleaf bat, Hipposideros cineraceus
Large Mindanao roundleaf bat, Hipposideros coronatus
Telefomin roundleaf bat, Hipposideros corynophyllus
Cox's roundleaf bat, Hipposideros coxi
Timor roundleaf bat, Hipposideros crumeniferus
Short-tailed roundleaf bat, Hipposideros curtus
Makira roundleaf bat, Hipposideros demissus
Diadem roundleaf bat, Hipposideros diadema
Fierce roundleaf bat, Hipposideros dinops
Borneo roundleaf bat, Hipposideros doriae
Khajuria's leaf-nosed bat, Hipposideros durgadasi
Dayak roundleaf bat, Hipposideros dyacorum
Hill's roundleaf bat, Hipposideros edwardshilli
House-dwelling leaf-nosed bat, Hipposideros einnaythu
Hipposideros fasensis
Sooty roundleaf bat, Hipposideros fuliginosus
Fulvus roundleaf bat, Hipposideros fulvus
Cantor's roundleaf bat, Hipposideros galeritus
Andersen's leaf-nosed bat, Hipposideros gentilis
Grand roundleaf bat, Hipposideros grandis
Griffin's leaf-nosed bat, Hipposideros griffini
Thailand roundleaf bat, Hipposideros halophyllus
Kolar leaf-nosed bat, Hipposideros hypophyllus
Crested roundleaf bat, Hipposideros inexpectatus
Arnhem leaf-nosed bat, Hipposideros inornatus
Jones's roundleaf bat, Hipposideros jonesi
Phou Khao Khouay leaf-nosed bat, Hipposideros khaokhouayensis
Khasian leaf-nosed bat, Hipposideros khasiana
Kunz's Bicolored Leaf-nosed Bat, Hipposideros kunzi
Lamotte's roundleaf bat, Hipposideros lamottei
Indian roundleaf bat, Hipposideros lankadiva
Intermediate roundleaf bat, Hipposideros larvatus
Large Asian roundleaf bat, Hipposideros lekaguli
Shield-faced roundleaf bat, Hipposideros lylei
Big-eared roundleaf bat, Hipposideros macrobullatus
Maduran leaf-nosed bat, Hipposideros madurae
Maggie Taylor's roundleaf bat, Hipposideros maggietaylorae
Aellen's roundleaf bat, Hipposideros marisae
Ethiopian large-eared roundleaf bat, Hipposideros megalotis
Fly River roundleaf bat, Hipposideros muscinus
Malayan roundleaf bat, Hipposideros nequam
Nicobar Leaf-nosed Bat, Hipposideros nicobarulae
Philippine forest roundleaf bat, Hipposideros obscurus
Orbiculus leaf-nosed bat, Hipposideros orbiculus
Biak roundleaf bat, Hipposideros papua
Hipposideros parnabyi
Peleng leaf-nosed bat, Hipposideros pelingensis
Pendlebury's roundleaf bat, Hipposideros pendleburyi
Pomona roundleaf bat, Hipposideros pomona
Philippine pygmy roundleaf bat, Hipposideros pygmaeus
Ridley's leaf-nosed bat, Hipposideros ridleyi
Laotian leaf-nosed bat, Hipposideros rotalis
Noack's roundleaf bat, Hipposideros ruber
Shield-nosed leaf-nosed bat, Hipposideros scutinares
Semon's roundleaf bat, Hipposideros semoni
Sorensen's leaf-nosed bat, Hipposideros sorenseni
Schneider's leaf-nosed bat, Hipposideros speoris
Northern leaf-nosed bat or narrow-eared roundleaf bat, Hipposideros stenotis
Sumba roundleaf bat or Sumban leaf-nosed bat, Hipposideros sumbae
Pratt's roundleaf bat, Hipposideros swinhoei
Maghreb leaf-nosed bat, Hipposideros tephrus
Lesser great leaf-nosed bat, Hipposideros turpis
Wollaston's roundleaf bat, Hipposideros wollastoni
 Genus Macronycteris
Commerson's leaf-nosed bat or Commerson's roundleaf bat, Macronycteris commersoni
Macronycteris cryptovalorona
Giant roundleaf bat, Macronycteris gigas
Saõ Tomé leaf-nosed bat, Macronycteris thomensis
Striped leaf-nosed bat, Macronycteris vittatus

Notes

References

Bibliography
Archer, M., Arena, D.A., Bassarova, M., Beck, R.M.D., Black, K., Boles, W.E., Brewer, P., Cooke, B.N., Crosby, K., Gillespie, A., Godthelp, H., Hand, S.J., Kear, B.P., Louys, J., Morrell, A., Muirhead, J., Roberts, K.K., Scanlon, J.D., Travouillon, K.J. and Wroe, S. 2006. Current status of species-level representation in faunas from selected fossil localities in the Riversleigh World Heritage Area, northwestern Queensland. Alcheringa Special Issue 1:1-17. 
Benda, P. and Vallo, P. 2009. Taxonomic revision of the genus Triaenops (Chiroptera: Hipposideridae) with description of a new species from southern Arabia and definitions of a new genus and tribe. Folia Zoologica 58(Monograph 1):1–45.
Hand, S.J. and Archer, M. 2005. A new hipposiderid genus (Microchiroptera) from an early Miocene bat community in Australia. Palaeontology 48(2):371–383.
Hand, S.J. and Kirsch, J.A.W. 2003. Archerops, a new annectent hipposiderid genus (Mammalia: Microchiroptera) from the Australian Miocene. Journal of Paleontology 77(6):1139–1151.
Hutcheon, J.M. and Kirsch, J.A.W. 2006. A moveable face: deconstructing the Microchiroptera and a new classification of extant bats. Acta Chiropterologica 8(1):1–10.
McKenna, M.C. and Bell, S.K. 1997. Classification of Mammals: Above the species level. New York: Columbia University Press, 631 pp. 
Simmons, N.B. 2005. Order Chiroptera. Pp. 312–529 in Wilson, D.E. and Reeder, D.M. (eds.). Mammal Species of the World: a taxonomic and geographic reference. 3rd ed. Baltimore: The Johns Hopkins University Press, 2 vols., 2142 pp. 
Ziegler, R. 2000. The bats (Chiroptera, Mammalia) from the Late Oligocene fissure fillings Herrlingen 8 and Herrlingen 9 near Ulm (Baden-Württemberg). Senckenbergiana Lethaea 80(2):647–683.

 
Bat families
Taxa named by Richard Lydekker